Matthew "Matt" O'Dowd (born 15 April 1976 in Swindon) is a British long-distance runner. He competed in the men's marathon at the 2004 Summer Olympics.

References

External links
 

1976 births
Living people
Sportspeople from Swindon
British male long-distance runners
British male marathon runners
Olympic athletes of Great Britain
Athletes (track and field) at the 2004 Summer Olympics
World Athletics Championships athletes for Great Britain